Grigori Panin (born November 24, 1985) is a Russian professional ice hockey defenceman who currently plays as captain for Salavat Yulaev Ufa in the Kontinental Hockey League (KHL).

Playing career
Panin first played with Lada Togliatti before spending 8 seasons with Ak Bars Kazan of the KHL. On June 21, 2014, Panin signed a one-year contract as a free agent with CSKA Moscow.

After three seasons with CSKA Moscow, Panin as a free agent joined his fourth KHL club, Salavat Yulaev Ufa, on July 11, 2017.

References

External links

Grigori Panin Profile at Russian Prospects

1985 births
Living people
Ak Bars Kazan players
HC CSKA Moscow players
HC Lada Togliatti players
Russian ice hockey defencemen
Salavat Yulaev Ufa players
Sportspeople from Tolyatti